Palazzo dei Congressi (formally: Palazzo dei Ricevimenti e dei Congressi) is a building located in the EUR district of Rome, Italy. The palazzo was designed by Adalberto Libera for the 1942 Universal Exposition. Construction started in 1938 but was cancelled due to World War II. It was completed in 1954.

Due to its large size, the palazzo hosted the fencing part of the modern pentathlon events for the 1960 Summer Olympics.

Gallery

In popular culture 
 The building serves as the backdrop in several shots of the Ac!d Reign Chronicles, a collaborative video project between Grimes and Hana Pestle.

References 
 1960 Summer Olympics official report.  Volume 2, Part 2. pp. 661, 761.
 Official website. 

Venues of the 1960 Summer Olympics
Olympic fencing venues
Olympic modern pentathlon venues
Sports venues in Italy
Rome Q. XXXII Europa